VA (Public & Science) (Swedish: "Vetenskap & Allmänhet") is a Vetenskap & Allmänhet, VA, is a non-profit association that wants to promote dialogue and openness between researchers and the general public.  VA operates primarily Sweden, but with an eye on European and International science communication including several new EU projects.  The organization was founded in 2002 and is currently based from Grev Turegatan 14 in Stockholm, Sweden.

VA's members consist of some 80 organizations, authorities, universities, companies and associations. In addition, it has a number of individual members. The organization is funded through membership fees, project grants and a grant from the Swedish Ministry of Education and Research.

VA's Purpose and Primary Objectives
 Increase collaboration between researchers and the public.
 Increase knowledge and dialogue about:
 Public perceptions of research and research needs
 Prerequisites for research, research methods and results
 Methods for science communication
 Be a leading knowledge hub for public engagement and science communication
 Strengthen all aspects of engagement with society; democratic, cultural as well as for the benefit and education of society

Part of what the VA does is carry out surveys and studies with the aim of increasing knowledge about the relationships between science and society at large. This includes an annual barometer into the Swedish public's general attitudes towards science and researchers, as well as more specific studies on how opinion-forming groups in society view and use research, how researchers interact with society, and methods for dialogue on science and research.

VA also arranges many events and activities aimed at stimulating dialogue between researchers and the public in new ways and in novel arenas. VA is the Swedish national co-ordinator for the science festival European Researchers’ Night. The first Researchers' Night was run in Sweden in September 2005 and in 2017 events were run in 29 cities in Sweden. 
VA also organises the  Researchers' Grand Prix, a science communication competition for researchers and mass experiments in schools, a citizen science initiative that engages pupils in real research. Other activities include Science Cafés. VA also participates in societal debate via traditional as well as social media.

VA is currently a partner in three EU-funded Horizon 2020 projects SciShops: ORION, Open Responsible research and Innovation to further Outstanding Knowledge, is aimed at fostering RRI and open science in research performing and research funding organisations. SciShops will expand the ecosystem of Science Shops in Europe and BLOOM is aimed at raising public awareness and interest in the bioeconomy through dialogue and co-creation activities.

VA is a member of EUSEA (European Science Events Association), ECSA (European Citizen Science Association) and the Living Knowledge network.

Impact & Development Work  

 Letters and consultation responses
 Debate articles
 ARCS  - a Swedish collaborative project to create a national portal for citizen research.
 Bloom  -  EU project to create regional networks to increase public interest and knowledge of bioeconomy
 EU-Citizen.Science -  EU project  for citizen research in Europe
 Falling Walls Engage Hub Sweden - the northern European node in an international network for research communication and research collaboration.
 March for Science / How do you know that? - Sweden
 News evaluator  - Researchers, teachers and students together develop a tool for teaching source criticism
 ORION  Open Science -  EU project that will make research in life science and biomedicine more inclusive for society
 RETHINK - EU project  for research communication in the future
 RRI Tools - EU project that has created a toolbox for responsible research and innovation
 Cooperation
 SciShops  - EU project where a European network for Science shops is created
 Smedpack  - a package solution for the safety of pharmaceutical consumers
 Super MoRRI - will develop and improve methods for measuring activities within RRI (responsible research and innovation).
 Swafs - Swedish platform to influence Horizon 2020
 Youcount -  EU project  to increase young people's participation in society.
 Open science workshops

Studies 

 Public attitudes
 The VA Barometer  - recurring measurement of the Swedish public's view of science, research and researchers.
 Science in society  (ViS)  - recurring measurement and in-depth studies of the Swedish public's view of science, research and researchers in collaboration with the SOM Institute.
 International comparisons  - analyzes of foreign attitude surveys

Other surveys:

 Communication about the corona - A study of the public's understanding, perception and how they are reached by information about the COVID-19 pandemic in Sweden.
 Animal experiments  - the public's attitudes towards animal experiments
 Tiresome acquired and quickly ruined? In-  depth study on researcher confidence
 Linnaeus Jubilee  - The public about Carl von Linné 2007
 Science & Values  - How does the outlook on life, values, cultural and social background affect the view of knowledge, research and researchers?
 Attitudes of children and young people
 Generation Equation - A report on children and young people's attitudes to school, school subjects and learning in Sweden
 Knowledge owns  -  young people's attitudes to knowledge, research and researchers
 Myself as a researcher  - analysis of children's drawings of themselves as researchers.
 Researcher 
 Researchers' views on communication and open science
 Research on research communication
 Journalists / media & communicators
 Authorities  - Research-based knowledge in Swedish administration
 Business  - the  view of research and science in business
 Politicians  - politicians' relationship to science
 Collaboration indicators
 School meets science  - the  school world's view of research and contacts with researchers

Dialogue Activities 

 Allthings.BioPRO  - an online game about bioeconomy
 Almedalen
 Researcher dialogue
 ComScience  - EU project to try new forms of conversation about research.
 Science Café  - coffee with a researcher
 Researcher Friday -  part of European Researchers' Night. EU project that shows how fun, exciting and everyday research can be.
 Mass experiment
 Researcher Grand Prix  - research communication competition
 Forum for research communication  - conference for actors in research communication
 Find Vasa's missing cannons
 Media seminars for researchers
 New images of research
 Post-antibiotic futures
 Collaborative seminar
 Research for the future  - conference on future research policy
 ODE  - external dialogue and commitment
 Science & Society  - seminar on the collaboration of science with the outside world
 Stockholm Meeting with tour  - seminar to promote mobility and collaboration between sectors, universities and countries
 Youth Parliament  - introduces students to parliamentary procedures on science and research
 VA-day  - Science & Publicity's annual half-day conference when this year's VA project is presented and discussed.
 What is science?  - A film project with the aim of increasing children and young people's scientific understanding and ability.
 2WAYS  -  EU project to test new ways of disseminating knowledge about research

The Board of Representatives

VA's board consists of representatives from the association's members. There are currently thirteen members and each member representative serves for a term of two years.  The following are the representatives as of 2021.

 Board President - Ann Fust
 Young Researchers Representative - Anna Hedlund
 Foundation for Strategic Research Representative - Lars Hultman
 IKEM Innovations and the chemical industry Representative - Magnus Huss
 KTH - Kungl. Institute of Technology Representative - Sigbritt Karlsson
 Engineers of Sweden Representative - Ulrika Lindstrand
 Chairman of the RIFO Society members of parliament and researchers - Betty Malmberg
 The Swedish Museum of Natural History - Lisa Månsson
 Student Unions Representative - David Samuelsson
 The Swedish Research Council - Sven Stafström
 IVA - Kungl. Academy of Engineering Sciences - Tuula Teeri
 Consultant - Urban Wass
 Freelance Journalist - Jack Werner

References

External links
 Vetenskap & Allmänhet website
 Researchers' Night in Sweden
 Researchers' Grand Prix

Scientific organizations based in Sweden
Science in society